Rallinyssus is a genus of mites in the family Rhinonyssidae. There are about 12 described species in Rallinyssus.

Species
These 12 species belong to the genus Rallinyssus:

 Rallinyssus amaurornis Wilson, 1965
 Rallinyssus caudistigmus Strandtmann, 1948
 Rallinyssus congolensis Fain, 1956
 Rallinyssus cychramus Wilson, 1965
 Rallinyssus gallinulae Fain, 1960
 Rallinyssus limnocoracis Fain, 1956
 Rallinyssus porzanae Wilson, 1967
 Rallinyssus rallinae Wilson, 1966
 Rallinyssus sorae Pence & Young, 1979
 Rallinyssus strandtmanni Gretillat, 1961
 Rallinyssus trappi (Amaral, 1962)
 Rallinyssus verheyeni Fain, 1963

References

Rhinonyssidae
Articles created by Qbugbot